Villiers-Saint-Frédéric is a commune in the Yvelines department in the Île-de-France region in north-central France.

It is known for having one of the largest Renault factories in France, where they produce tools and design new fittings for the vehicles.

The commune residents also store many films, warehoused at Rambouillet. In 1990, a fire broke out in the warehouse and many one-of-a-kind reels of film were destroyed.

References

See also
Communes of the Yvelines department

Communes of Yvelines